Caloptilia braccatella is a moth of the family Gracillariidae. It is known from Rhodes, Italy, Turkey and the European part of Russia.

The larvae feed on Pistacia atlantica.

References

braccatella
Moths of Europe
Moths of Asia
Moths described in 1870